Carmópolis is a municipality located in the Brazilian state of Sergipe. Its population was 16,937 (2020). Carmópolis borders on the municipalities of Japaratuba, Rosário do Catete, General Maynard, and Santo Amaro das Brotas, all in the state of Sergipe.

References

Municipalities in Sergipe
Populated places established in 1922